DJ Lynnwood is an internationally known electronic dance music producer, DJ and radio personality. He is one of the first true pioneers of DJ mixing, starting at age 10.

Career
DJ Lynnwood's career began in the early 1980s, when he toured the local club scene east of Los Angeles as a youth. In 1983 he landed his first radio gig, mixing live on the radio and hosting the Inland Empire' first underground radio program on KUOR-FM 89.1 FM. This small college radio station, under the hands of Lynnwood, Fred Plimley, the Big V (Bobby Sato), The Mity OT and more, became the number two radio station in the market, forcing power player KGGI to begin watching Lynnwood and his cohorts. Meanwhile, DJ Lynnwood broke ground in the local dance scene. Joining the Night Life Productions crew, Lynnwood played nearly every major event at the National Orange Show. In 1984, DJ Lynnwood and Fred Plimley formed the entity "World Class Productions" producing the market's first dance/concert at the National Orange Show, "Rock of the 80's Take I"  Recording artists "Stop" performed live, with DJ Lynnwood and others headlining the DJ Lineup to an audience of 8000.

In November 1987 DJ Lynnwood, with the help of area promoters brought "Rock of the 80's Take 2" to the National Orange Show. Headlining were recording artists DINO (Las Vegas, NV) CYRE (New York), to an audience of about 8000 at the National Orange Show in San Bernardino, Ca.

In 1988 Lynnwood crossed town to commercial radio station KOLA where he was named APD/MD of the west coast's first 100% dance music radio station. He produced "Hot Hits Music Mix" on Friday and Saturday nights with longtime friend and mentor DJ Tom Tom. He also owned and operated "Club Z" in Palm Springs, California, the area's first under-21 night club. He began his mix show at KPSI-FM in Palm Springs in early 1888 under MD Mike Keane. In mid-1988 Lynnwood began spinning at Southern California's 18 and up night club, Club Metro, with an average audience of 22,000 customers per week. DJ Lynnwood went on to become the club's Entertainment Director. He remained on staff until late 1998, juggling his time between KOLA, Club Z, his regular gigs and his mix shows. Lynnwood sold his interest in Club Z when Sonny Bono was elected mayor of Palm Springs, forecasting the new Mayor's "Clean Up Palm Springs" campaign would have and adverse effect on business. Club Z was closed by the city of Palm Springs three months later. Club Metro remained a force in the Inland Empire club scene until late 2003 when the owner, Al Kirsinas, closed the nightclub after witnessing a fatal shooting out front on Thanksgiving.

In 1993 DJ Lynnwood was hired at KGGI (99.1 FM) Riverside as the Mix Show Director. Rumor has it that he was so offended at their offer, that he insisted he work for free until the ratings came out. After three months of producing the "HotMix" on Saturday nights, KGGI Program Director Larry Martino and consultants Bob West and Jerry Clifton offered DJ Lynnwood a handsome package, which he accepted. The "Earthquake Mix" was born in June 1993, the show "Could happen at any time". His Earthquake Mixes aired for thirty minutes in each time slot, and grew to over 30 hours per week. This feature was the highest rated show on KGGI for a number of years.

The success of the Earthquake Mix and Club Metro combined with his mix shows on several other stations in the US propelled Lynnwood. In 1996 he released his first DJ Mix compilation CD, "Earth Shakin' Deep House Vol. 1". The CD was a huge success, selling over a quarter of a million units in the US and Canada alone. DJ Lynnwood began touring all across the country at clubs and raves. In December 1997, DJ Lynnwood was approached by music industry colleague Tania Torrosian, then Label Manager for Underground Construction Records ("UC Music") in Chicago, Illinois to appear on their project Four Times Harder. DJ Lynnwood was the first west coast DJ to appear on a Chicago-based project. This CD helped shape DJ Lynnwood's national career, and helped coin the term "Chicago Hard House". Lynnwood went on to product six other successful DJ Mix compilations for UC Music until their demise in 2002.

In mid 1998, DJ Lynnwood released Four Times Harder Volume 2 on UC Music with Chicago's Kevin Halstead, Rick Garcia, and (late) DJ Attack.

In late 1998, DJ Lynnwood released Keep It Movin on UC Music. While on tour in April, 1999, promoting this release, DJ Lynnwood was being transported to his hotel after a gig in Phoenix, Arizona when his car was struck by a drunk driver. DJ Lynnwood, wearing a seatbelt, was ejected from the vehicle, which subsequently rolled over his body. DJ Lynnwood, against all odds, fully recovered from his injuries (including 3 breaks in the spine, 2 broken knees, 2 broken shoulders, broken ribs, hands and major head trauma) and completed his tour while wearing a back brace.

In mid-1999, DJ Lynnwood released Dance To This on UC Music and began syndication of his new radio show, Interference - The Sound of the International Underground.

In early-2000 DJ Lynnwood released House Trip 2000 on UC Music.

In mid-2001 DJ Lynnwood released House Trip 2001 on UC Music.

By 2002, Interference was on 170 radio stations in the United States and broadcast on Groove Radio (www.grooveradio.com).

By 2005, interference was on 210 radio stations in the United States.

In October 2009 DJ Lynnwood relaunched his "Earthquake Mix" on KGGI-FM along with a free podcast available under "DJ Lynnwood's Earthquake Mix" on iTunes, Stitcher, Apple Podcast and on http://earthquakemix.com.

In January, 2012 DJ Lynnwood launched the DJ Lynnwood App for Apple and Android devices.

In June, 2013 DJ Lynnwood launched three new radio shows - THE MIX SHOW, BANG3RS RADIO SHOW and THE EDM QUICK MIX. On July 8, 2013, DJ Lynnwood was signed to national syndication for THE MIX SHOW, DJ Lynnwood's Earthquake Mix and The EDM Quick Mix.

In April, 2017 DJ Lynnwood launched the Earthquake Mix skill for Amazon Echo, the first dance mix show on the blooming platform.

In 2019, DJ Lynnwood is actively involved in the dance music (EDM) scene. In addition to his radio show, he is now involved in song writing, composing, producing and remixing, label A&R, management and is a Music Curator. He performs regularly at night spots all over the US, South America, Canada, Asia and Europe.

Discography

Singles
DJ Lynnwood "Wy-Oh" (Roton) (Forthcoming)
Ricky Martin, Bad Bunny & Residente "Cantalo" (Universal Latino) (Forthcoming)
Kristine Kalliope "Twisted" (Upscale) (Forthcoming)
Madonna "I Don't Search, I Find" (Live Nation/Interscope) (2019) *No. 1 BILLBOARD DANCE CLUB SONGS CHART 
Black Eyed Peas x J Balvin "Ritmo" (Sony) (2019)
Pet Shop Boys "Dreamland" (x2/Awal-Kobalt) (2019)
Madonna "Crave" (Live Nation/Interscope) (2019) *No. 1 BILLBOARD DANCE CLUB SONGS CHART 
Chrissy Metz "I'm Standing With You (Real Songs) (2019)
Anggun "Perfect World" (Universal) (2019)
Madonna "I Rise" (Live Nation/Interscope) (2019) *No. 1 BILLBOARD DANCE CLUB SONGS CHART 
Madonna "Medellin" (Live Nation/Interscope) (2019) No. 1 BILLBOARD DANCE CLUB SONGS CHART  
KC & The Sunshine Band f/Nile Rodgers "Give Me Some More" (Sunshine Sound) (2019)
Mari Burelle "Let's Hear It For The Boy" (Lit Lyfe Music) (2019)
Mahkenna x Darko "Ready For Love" (2019)
MORGXN "Home" (Hollywood Records) (Forthcoming)
Rocky Morningside "Moonlight" (Brethren Records) (2019)
Alexis Ashley "Tomorrow" (BRKLYN Records) (2019)
Katerina Villegas “Hey Mami” (Beauty Queen Records) (2018) (#4 Breakout, Hot Shot Debut •41 BILLBOARD DANCE CLUB SONGS CHART)
Jennifer Hudson "I'll Fight" (Diane Warren) (2018)
U2 "Summer Of Love" (Island Records) (2018)
Anggun "The Good Is Back" (Universal) (2018)
Taryn Manning "Light" (GLTCHLFE Records) (Unreleased)
Gattuso f/Myah "Who We Are" (T&T Records) (2018)
U2 "Love Is Bigger Than Anything In Its Way" (Island Records) (2018) *No. 1 BILLBOARD DANCE CLUB SONGS CHART 
Hilary Roberts “There For You” (Dauman Records) (2018)
Sabrina Carpenter & Jonas Blue “Alien” (Hollywood) (2018) *No. 1 BILLBOARD DANCE CLUB SONGS CHART 
The Trash Mermaids “XPerial” (The Trash Mermaids Records) (2018)
Enrique Iglesias “El Bano” (Sony) (2018)
Gerina & Nomad “Remedy” (Dauman/Feedback Digital) (2018)
Anggun “What We Remember” (Universal) (2018)
Keala Settle & Cast of The Greatest Showman “This Is Me” (Atlantic) (2018)
Joanna Michelle "Blaze The Dancefloor" (Twin Angel) (2018)
The Trash Mermaids "Cryptic Love" (The Trash Mermaids Records) (2017) *No. 1 Breakout BILLBOARD DANCE CLUB SONGS CHART.
Katerina Villegas "Dangerous Love" (Beauty Queen Records) (2017) *No. 1 Breakout BILLBOARD DANCE CLUB SONGS CHART.
Ben Platt and the Original Cast of the Broadway Musical "Dear Evan Hansen" "Waving Through A Window" (Atlantic) (2017) *No. 1 BILLBOARD DANCE CLUB SONGS CHART 
Kato & Sigala f/ Hailee Steinfeld "Show You Love" (Universal Republic) (2017)
Smash Mouth "Walkin' On The Sun 2017" (BMG) (2017)
Taryn Manning "GLTCHLFE" (GLTCHLFE Records) (2017) *No. 1 Breakout BILLBOARD DANCE CLUB SONGS CHART.
Tami "Sugar Shack" (SFM Records) (2017)
Julia Marie "Just A Moment" (RM Records) (2017)
Ron Reeser "No Matter What (f/Liam Smith)" (Upscale) (2017) *No. 1 Breakout, Power Pick BILLBOARD DANCE CLUB SONGS CHART 
Anjali "Undress" (Curry Money) (2017) *Power Pick BILLBOARD DANCE CLUB SONGS CHART 
Xenia Ghali "Places (f/Raquel Castro)" (Funky Sheep) (2017) *No. 1, No. 1 Breakout BILLBOARD DANCE CLUB SONGS CHART 
Majesty "Living In The Moonlight" (Daumann Music) (2017)
Enrique Iglesias featuring Tinashe & Javeda "Duele El Corazon" (English Version) (Sony) (2016) *No. 1 BILLBOARD DANCE CLUB SONGS CHART 
Enrique Iglesias featuring Wisin "Duele El Corazon" (Sony) (2016) *No. 1 BILLBOARD DANCE CLUB SONGS CHART 
Erika Jayne "How Many F**ks" (Pretty Mess) (2016) *No. 1 BILLBOARD DANCE CLUB SONGS CHART 
Xenia Ghali "Under These Lights" (Roc Cartel) (2016) *No. 1 BILLBOARD DANCE CLUB SONGS CHART 
Demi Lovato "Confident" (Hollywood) (2015) *No. 1 BILLBOARD DANCE CLUB SONGS CHART 
Mr. Vegas ft. Pitbull "My Jam" (Mr. 305) (2015)
ZZ Ward "Love 3X" (Hollywood) (2015) *No. 1 Breakout BILLBOARD DANCE CLUB SONGS CHART
Mohombi "Universe" (Le Clique) (2015) *No. 1 Breakout BILLBOARD DANCE CLUB SONGS CHART
Lynn Wood & Kimberly Cole "One, One More Time" (Roc Cartel) (2015) 
Ono "Woman Power" (Twisted) (2105) *No. 1 Breakout BILLBOARD DANCE CLUB SONGS CHART
Erika Jayne "Crazy" (Pretty Mess) (2015) *No. 1, No. 1 Breakout BILLBOARD DANCE CLUB SONGS CHART 
Ono "Angel" (Twisted) (2014) *No. 1, No. 1 Breakout BILLBOARD DANCE CLUB SONGS CHART
Shara Strand "RSVP" (D1 Music) (2014) *No. 1 Breakout BILLBOARD DANCE CLUB SONGS CHART
Erika Jayne "PAINKILLR" (Pretty Mess) (2014) *No. 1, No. 1 BREAKOUT, HOT SHOT DEBUT *35, POWER PICK, GREATEST GAINER 2 CONSECUTIVE WEEKS BILLBOARD DANCE CLUB SONGS CHART
Demi Lovato "Really Don't Care" (Hollywood Records) *No. 1, No. 1 BREAKOUT, HOT SHOT DEBUT, GREATEST GAINER 3 CONSECUTIVE WEEKS BILLBOARD DANCE CLUB SONGS CHART
Cole Plante f./Myon & Shane 54 "If I Fall" (Teknicole/Hollywood Records) (2014) *No. 1 BREAKOUT BILLBOARD DANCE CLUB SONGS CHART
Scotty Boy f/Sue Cho "Shiny Disco Balls" (PopRox) (2014) *No. 1 BILLBOARD DANCE CLUB SONGS CHART
Demi Lovato "Neon Lights" (Hollywood Records) (2013) *No. 1 BREAKOUT, No. 1 BILLBOARD DANCE CLUB SONGS CHART
Kimberly Davis "With You" (D1 Music) (2013) *No. 4 BREAKOUT BILLBOARD DANCE CLUB SONGS CHART
Natalia Kills "Saturday Night" (Cherry Tree/Interscope Records) (2013) *No. 1 BREAKOUT BILLBOARD DANCE CLUB SONGS CHART
Cole Plante "Lie To Me" (Hollywood Records) (2103) *No. 1 BILLBOARD DANCE CLUB SONGS CHART
Backstreet Boys "In A Moment Like This" (BMG Music) (2013) *No. 1 BREAKOUT BILLBOARD DANCE CLUB SONGS CHART
Selena Gomez "Slow Down" (Hollywood Records) (2013) *No. 1 BREAKOUT, GREATEST GAINER, No. 1 BILLBOARD DANCE CLUB SONGS CHART (9/28/2013 Cover Date)
Havana Brown "Flashing Lights" (2101 Music) (2013) *No. 3 BREAKOUT BILLBOARD DANCE CLUB SONGS CHART, No. 1 BILLBOARD DANCE CLUB SONGS CHART (11/9/2013 Cover Date)
YLA f/Vanessa Hudgens "$$$ex" (Roc Nation) (2013) *No. 4 BREAKOUT BILLBOARD DANCE CLUB SONGS CHART
Colette Carr "Never Gonna Happen" (Cherry Tree) (2013) *No. 1 BREAKOUT BILLBOARD DANCE CLUB SONGS CHART
Demi Lovato "Heart Attack" (Hollywood Records) (2013) *No. 1 BILLBOARD DANCE CLUB SONGS CHART
D'Manti "Let's Just Dance" (Diamond) 2013 *No. 1 BREAKOUT BILLBOARD DANCE CLUB SONGS CHART
Yulianna "Don't Take Your Love Away" (Zvon Music) 2013 *No. 5 BREAKOUT BILLBOARD DANCE CLUB SONGS CHART
Gimm+Icky "Shake That" (Hit Shop) (2013) *No. 1 BREAKOUT BILLBOARD DANCE CLUB SONGS CHART 3/2/2013 Issue
Enrique Iglesias "Finally Found You" (Universal) (2012) *No. 1 BILLBOARD DANCE CLUB SONGS CHART
Noelia "My Everything" (Pink Star Music) (2012) *No. 2 BILLBOARD DANCE CLUB SONGS CHART 
Jerad Finck "Runaway" (2012)
Beyoncé "Love On Top" (Columbia) 2011 *No. 1 BILLBOARD DANCE CLUB SONGS CHART
Blush "Dance On" (Far East Entertainment Records) 2011 *No. 1 BILLBOARD DANCE CLUB SONGS CHART 
Linnea "Dance Thru Fire" (Linnea & Co) 2011
Beyoncé "Best Thing I Never Had" (Music World/Columbia) 2011 *No. 1 BILLBOARD DANCE CLUB SONGS CHART 
Gia Bella "Jump" (NYX Extreme) 2011
Sultan & Ned Shepard f/Nadia Ali "Call My Name" (Harem) 2011 *No. 1 BILLBOARD DANCE CLUB SONGS CHART
DJ Rayzn "The Playground" (Feedback Digital) 2011
Kerli "Army of Love" (Island/DefJam) 2011 *No. 1 BILLBOARD DANCE CLUB SONGS CHART 
Dirty Heads "Stand Tall" (Promotional Only) 2011
Erika Jayne "One Hot Pleasure" (Pretty Mess Records) 2011 *No. 1 BILLBOARD DANCE CLUB SONGS CHART 
La Roux "In For The Kill" (Interscope) 2010 *No. 1 BILLBOARD DANCE CLUB SONGS CHART 
Linkin Park "Waiting For The End" (Warner Music) 2011 *No. 1 BILLBOARD DANCE CLUB SONGS CHART
Kwanza Jones "Think Again" (Innovation Entertainment) 2010
Brandon Flowers "Only The Young" (Island/DefJam) 2010
Kimberly Cole "Smack You" (Crystal Ship) 2010 *No. 1 BILLBOARD DANCE CLUB SONGS CHART
Margo "Habit" (Daumann Music) 2010
DJ Irene & DJ Lynnwood "Where's My Bitch" (Moist Music) 2010
Depeche Mode "Perfect" (Mute) 2010
DJ Rap f/ Fast Eddie "Drummin' N' Bassin'" (Impropa Records) 2009
Jet "K.I.A." (EMI) 2009
Gabriel & Dresden "New Path" (Organized Nature) 2009
Lynnwood's Revenge "New York" (Feedback Digital) 2009
Alanis Morissette "Not As We" (Maverick/Warner Bros) 2008 *No. 1 BILLBOARD DANCE CLUB SONGS CHART
Keri Hilson "Energy" (Interscope) 2008
Nina Lares "Like Lovers Don't (Feedback Digital) 2008
Paul Oakenfold f/OneRepublic "Not Over" (Perfecto Digital) 2008
Club District All Stars "Rock Star" (Texture Recordings) 2008
herMajesty "Across The Rooftops" (Feedback Digital) 2008
Barbara Tucker "Love Revolution" (Music Plant) 2008
Silversun Pickups "Lazy Eye" (Dangerbird) 2008
Jungle Brothers "I'll House You" (Feedback Digital) 2007
Lynnwood's Revenge "So Girl Tonight" (Feedback Digital) 2007
Nelly Furtado "Say It Right" (Interscope) 2007 *No. 1 BILLBOARD DANCE CLUB SONGS CHART
Funk Slippers "The Way You Move" (Feedback Digital) 2006
Craig David & Sting "Rise And Fall" (Atlantic) 2005

Albums 
Rainy Day Rhythms 2 (Feedback Digital) 2013
Feedback 7.0 (Feedback Digital) 2012
Feedback 6.0 (Feedback Digital) 2011
Feedback 5.0 (Feedback Digital) 2010
Feedback 4.0 (Feedback Digital) 2009
Feedback 3.0 (Feedback Digital) 2008
Feedback 2.0 (Feedback Digital) 2008
Feedback 1.0 (Feedback Digital) 2007
HouseTrip 2001 (SHR/UC Music) 2001
HouseTrip 2000 (SHR/UC Music) 2000
Dance To This (UC Music) 1999
Four Times Harder Volume 2 (UC Music) 1998
Keep It Movin' (UC Music) 1998
Four Times Harder Volume 1 (UC Music) 1997
Earth Shakin' Deep House (PR Records) 1996

References

External links 
 Official site
 Discogs

Sources 
 Record sales can be verified via Soundscan
 Radio shows can be verified at Los Angeles Radio Guide
 Biographical Content from Billboard Magazine 

Club DJs
DJs from Los Angeles
Remixers
American electronic musicians
American house musicians
Year of birth missing (living people)
Living people